Hamirpur district is one of the 75 districts of Uttar Pradesh state of India and Hamirpur town is the district headquarters. Hamirpur district is a part of Chitrakoot Division. The district occupies an area of 4,121.9 km². The district has a population of 1,104,285 (2011 census). As of 2011 it is the third least populous district of Uttar Pradesh (out of 71), after Mahoba and Chitrakoot. Two major rivers Yamuna and Betwa meet here. On the banks of river Betwa lies the "Coarse sand" which is exported to many parts in U.P.

Economy
In 2006 the Ministry of Panchayati Raj named Hamirpur one of the country's 250 most backward districts (out of a total of 640). It is one of the 34 districts in Uttar Pradesh currently receiving funds from the Backward Regions Grant Fund Programme (BRGF).

History
Hamirpur is the home of Bundelkhand Kesri & Bundelkhand Gandhi Dewan Shatrughan Singh and his wife the valiant freedom fighter Rani Rajendra Kumari. The Rani also defeated the sitting UP Chief Minister CB Gupta in a byelection in 1958. Dewan Saheb performed the first Gram Daan to Acharya Vinobha Bhave.

Demographics

According to the 2011 census Hamirpur district, Uttar Pradesh has a population of 1,104,285, roughly equal to the nation of Cyprus or the US state of Rhode Island. This gives it a ranking of 417th in India (out of a total of 640). Its population growth rate over the decade 2001-2011 was 5.78%. Hamirpur has a sex ratio of 860 females for every 1000 males, and a literacy rate of 70.16%. Scheduled Castes made up 21.84% of the population.

Languages

At the time of the 2011 Census of India, 66.43% of the population in the district spoke Hindi, 32.01% Bundeli and 1.36% Urdu as their first language.

Tongues spoken in Hamirpur include Bundeli, which has a lexical similarity of 72-91% with Hindi (compared to 60% for German and English) and is spoken by about 7,800,000 people in Bundelkhand.

Notable persons 

 Dewan Shatrughan Singh - Father of the Freedom Movement in Bundelkhand
 Swami Brahmanand - MP, Congress
 Ashok Kumar Singh Chandel - MLA, BJP
 Sanjay Pratap Singh, MD, FAAN, Chief of Staff - Creighton University Hospital, USA
 Vijay Bahadur Singh, Sr. Advocate ( High Court), Ex. MP, Ex. Advocate General
 Ganga Charan Rajput, Ex. MP
 Pushpendra Singh Chandel, MP, BJP

Villages
Hamirpur is a Town and Tehsil in Hamirpur District of Uttar Pradesh. According to census 2011 information the sub-district code of Hamirpur Block (CD) is 00864. Total area of hamirpur tehsil is 1,105 km² including 1,089.51 km² rural area and 15.82 km² urban area. Hamirpur tehsil has a population of 3,64,464 peoples, out of which urban population is 88,015 while rural population is 2,76,449. Hamirpur has a population density of 330 inhabitants per square kilometre. There are about 68,440 houses in the sub-district, including 16,528 urban houses and 51,912 rural houses.

When it comes to literacy, 60.10% population of hamirpur tehsil is literate, out of which 68.86% males and 49.91% females are literate.

List of Villages in Hamirpur 

There are about 192 villages in hamirpur te

hsil.

References

External links
Hamirpur district on Bundelkhanddarshan.com
 Hamirpur district official website

 
Districts of Uttar Pradesh